The information technology sector in Morocco has been witnessing significant expansion. Morocco is the first country in North Africa to install a 3G network.  The number of Internet subscribers in the country jumped 73% in 2006 over the previous year. Further, a new offshore site at Casablanca, with state-of-the-art technologies and other incentives, has grabbed the attention of many global multinationals. Setting up offshore service centers in the nation has become tempting. Such is the rate of growth, that off-shoring and IT activities are estimated to contribute $500 million to the country's GDP and employ 30,000 people by 2015. The communications sector  already accounts for half of all foreign direct investments Morocco received over the past five years.

IT sector
The IT sector generated a turnover of Dh7bn ($910,000m) in 2007, which represented an 11% increase compared to 2006. The number of Moroccan internet subscribers in 2007 amounted to 526,080, representing an increase of 31.6% compared to the previous year and a 100% increase compared to 2005. The national penetration for internet subscription remains low, even though it increased from 0.38% in 2004 to 1.72% in 2007. Yet over 90% of subscribers have a broadband ADSL connection, which is one of the highest ratios in the world. While the telecoms sector remains the big earner, with Dh33bn ($4.3bn), the IT and off shore industries should generate Dh21bn ($2.7bn) each by 2012. In addition, the number of employees should increase from 40,000 to 125,000. The government hopes that adding more local content to the internet will increase usage. There have also been efforts to add more computers to schools and universities. E-commerce is likely to take off in the next few years, especially as the use of credit cards is gaining more ground in Morocco. Although computer and internet use have made a great leap forward in the past five years, the IT market still finds itself in infancy and offers great potential for further development.

Telecommunications

The mobile telephony segment comprises three operators: Maroc Telecom, the former state-owned company, with a market share of 58.2 per cent in 2008. Méditel (31.5 per cent) and, since April 2007, Wana (10.4 per cent).  Maroc Telecom is expected to lose 12 per cent of the mobile market share. The mobile telephony market is growing rapidly, the number of subscribers reached 22.3 million in September 2008. In 2008, over 64 per cent of the population had more than one mobile phone in their households, compared to 48 per cent in 2005. The introduction of customer loyalty plans, the downward trend in prices and the enhancement of service offerings over the last two years have further boosted mobile telephony. As of June 2008, the mobile penetration rate had risen to 69.4 per cent, as against 57.8 per cent in June 2007.

In the fixed-line telephony segment, 3G telecommunications licences have been granted to two operators, Méditel and Wana. The data on fixed-line telephony published by the national telecommunications regulator ANRT in March 2008 indicate a fixed-line penetration rate of about 13.3 per cent, with the number of subscribers rising from 1.62 million in March 2007 to over 2.71 million in March 2008.

Offshoring

In 2009, Morocco entered the Gartner top 30 list for the first time, thanks to its population's language skills and cultural compatibility, especially with regard to the French-speaking markets in Europe. Morocco opened its doors to offshoring in July 2006, as one component of the development initiative Plan Emergence, and has so far attracted roughly half of the French-speaking call centres that have gone offshore so far and a number of the Spanish ones. In 2007 the country had about 200 callcentres, including 30 of significant size, that employ a total of over 18,000 people.

Government policy
The future of the Moroccan IT sector was laid out in M@roc 2006–12, an initiative by the Moroccan government. The plan aims to increase the combined value of the telecoms and IT sector from Dh24bn ($3.1bn) in 2004 to Dh60bn ($7.8bn) in 2012.  
In 2009 Morocco announced it will create a commission for the protection of personal data. The move comes as the country is seeking to adapt the laws pertaining to the treatment of personal data, to those of the EU. This is expected to strengthen its offshoring and outsourcing market. In recent years the government also launched several science parks, and areas dedicated to BPO and IT.

References

Morocco
Science and technology in Morocco